Eddie Connolly (29 October 1985 – 17 September 2015) was an Irish hurler.   He played for his local club Loughmore–Castleiney and was a member of the Tipperary senior inter-county team.

On 13 March 2011, he made his senior debut for Tipperary against Offaly, starting at right corner back in the National Hurling League in a 1-20 to 0-10 victory.
Eddie was an accomplished defender in hurling and Gaelic football, playing senior hurling and football for the premier county. Eddie captained Tipperary to an All-Ireland Intermediate hurling championship in 2012. He was also a distinguished player for his college Dublin Institute of technology.

Connolly was diagnosed with brain cancer in 2013.  He died on 17 September 2015 at the age of 29.

References

1985 births
2015 deaths
Deaths from brain cancer in the Republic of Ireland
Loughmore-Castleiney hurlers
Tipperary inter-county hurlers